Eutreta parasparsa is a species of tephritid or fruit flies in the genus Eutreta of the family Tephritidae.

Distribution
Paraguay, Argentina, Brazil.

References

Tephritinae
Insects described in 1965
Diptera of South America